Jerry Weldon (born September 27, 1957) is a tenor saxophonist, noted for his involvement in various groups such as Lionel Hampton Orchestra and Harry Connick, Jr.'s big band. He is seen as a "veteran" of the New York jazz scene.

Career
Weldon graduated from the Rutgers University Jazz Program in 1981 and joined the Lionel Hampton Orchestra. He worked with Hampton until he died in 2002. He subsequently worked with organist Jack McDuff & his "Heatin' System" band.

In 1990, Weldon became a charter member and featured soloist with Harry Connick Jr.'s newly formed big band. Since then, he has toured with Connick, and was also part of his Broadway musical production, Thou Shalt Not. From 2016 to 2018, he was a member of the “house band" on HARRY, Connick’s daytime television variety show. In addition to Weldon's work with Connick, he performs regularly as a leader of his own groups in New York City and tours throughout the U.S. and Europe.

Personal life
Weldon is married to author Virginia DeBerry.

Discography

As self and collaborations
 Midtown Blues (Amosaya, 1998)
 3 O'Clock in the Morning: Live at Smoke (Dex Jazz, 2006)
 Well Done! (Recorded Live at Smoke) (Dex Jazz, 2008)
 Don't Look Back (Index Jazz, 2010)
 On the Move! (Doodlin', 2016)
 Those Were the Days (Cellar Live, 2018)
 Massimo Faraò Trio Meets Jerry Weldon (Racing Jazz, 2020)

Collaborations
 Five by Five with Bobby Forrester (Cats Paw, 1994)
 The Second Time Around with Bobby Forrester (Cats Paw, 1995)
 Head to Head with Michael Karn (Criss Cross, 1998)
 What's New with Massimo Faraò (Venus, 2017)
 We're Rollin' with Hammond Groovers (Nuccia, 2017)

With the N.Y. Hardbop Quintet
 The Clincher (TCB, 1995)			
 Rokermotion (TCB, 1996)			
 A Whisper Away (TCB, 1998)			
 A Mere Bag Of Shells (TCB, 2000)

As sideman
 Post No Bills (Joe Ascione, 1996)
 Remembering Blakey: A Tribute to Art Blakey (Ron Aprea, 2012) 
 Bass, Buddies & Blues (Keter Betts, 1998)	
 Bass, Buddies, Blues & Beauty Too (Keter Betts, 1999) 
 Live at the East Coast Jazz Festival (Keter Betts, 2000)
 The Dreamer in Me: Live at Dizzy's Club Coca-Cola (Freddy Cole, 2009)
 Blue Light, Red Light (Harry Connick, Jr. 1991)
 When My Heart Finds Christmas (Harry Connick, Jr., 1993)
 Star Turtle (Harry Connick, Jr., 1995)
 Come By Me (Harry Connick, Jr., 1999)
 Songs I Heard (Harry Connick, Jr., 2001)
 Harry for the Holidays (Harry Connick, Jr., 2003) 
 Only You (Harry Connick, Jr., 2004)
 Oh, My Nola (Harry Connick, Jr., 2007)
 Your Songs (Harry Connick, Jr., 2009)
 In Concert on Broadway (Harry Connick, Jr., 2011)
 Smokey Mary (Harry Connick, Jr., 2013)
 That Would Be Me (Harry Connick, Jr. 2015)
 True Love: A Celebration of Cole Porter (Harry Connick, Jr. 2019)
 Joey D! (Joey DeFrancesco, 2008)
 Big Shot (Papa John DeFrancesco, 2009)
 What Time Is It? (Giacomo Gates, 2017)
 Sentimental Journey (Lionel Hampton, 1985)
 For the Love of Music (Lionel Hampton, 1995)
 90th Birthday Celebration (Lionel Hampton, 2003)
 Greasy Street (Richie Hart, 2005)
 My Little French Dancer (Diane Hoffman, 2006)
 Write On, Capt'n (Jack McDuff, 1993)
 The Heatin' System (Jack McDuff, 1994)
 That's the Way I Feel About It (Jack McDuff, 1996)
 Bringin' It Home (Jack McDuff, 1998)
 Brotherly Love (Jack McDuff, 2001)
 Endangered Species (David Schumacher, 2005)
 Oriental Express (Akiko Tsuruga, 2009)
 Sakura (Akiko Tsuruga, 2012)

References

External links
 Jerry Weldon @ AllAboutJazz
 Jerry Weldon Organ Quartet
 Jerry Weldon official website

Jazz tenor saxophonists
American jazz saxophonists
American male saxophonists
Musicians from New York (state)
1957 births
Living people
21st-century American saxophonists
21st-century American male musicians
American male jazz musicians
Criss Cross Jazz artists